Mubarak Wajdi (born 22 August 1991) is a Saudi football player who currently plays as a defender for Arar.

References

External links 
 

1991 births
Living people
Saudi Arabian footballers
Ettifaq FC players
Al-Nahda Club (Saudi Arabia) players
Al-Kawkab FC players
Arar FC players
Saudi First Division League players
Saudi Professional League players
Saudi Second Division players
Association football defenders